Artem Lobov (born August 11, 1986) is a Russian former professional mixed martial artist and bareknuckle boxer based in Ireland. He previously competed in the Featherweight division of the Ultimate Fighting Championship (UFC) and has most recently competed in the Bare Knuckle Fighting Championship. A professional since 2010, Lobov was also a cast member of The Ultimate Fighter: Team McGregor vs. Team Faber. He has competed for the ACB, Ultimate Fighting Championship as well as the British promotions Cage Warriors and Cage Contender. Fighting out of Dublin, he is a member of SBG Ireland.

Mixed martial arts career

Early career
Lobov made his professional MMA debut with European promotion Cage Warriors in November 2010. He lost his pro debut to Patrick Vickers via unanimous decision. Prior to his appearance on The Ultimate Fighter, he held a professional record of 11–10–1 with one no contest. A natural featherweight competitor, he also competed at lightweight and welterweight.

Absolute Championship Berkut
Lobov faced Chechen Rasul Shovhalov on January 31, 2015, at the ACB 13. He won the fight by submission in the second round.

The Ultimate Fighter
To get into The Ultimate Fighter house, fighters must compete in preliminary fights to advance to the finals. Lobov lost his preliminary bout to Mehdi Baghdad, however coach and teammate Conor McGregor brought him back into the fight as each coach was allowed bring back one additional fighter who lost in the prelims.

In the round bouts he defeated Team USA's James Jenkins by TKO and repeated the outcome in the quarter-finals against Chris Gruetzemacher. In the semis he knocked out Julian Erosa of Team USA to advance to the finals where he would compete against Team Europe's Saul Rogers, a fellow SBG competitor who trains out of their Manchester branch. Due to visa issues Saul Rogers was removed from the finale and was replaced by Ryan Hall of Team USA.

Ultimate Fighting Championship
Lobov faced Ryan Hall on December 11, 2015, at The Ultimate Fighter 22 Finale. Hall defeated Lobov by unanimous decision.

Lobov next faced Alex White on February 6, 2016, at UFC Fight Night 82. He lost the fight by unanimous decision.

After the defeat to White, Lobov was reportedly in negotiations with a regional promotion in Russia. He was given a lifeline when it was announced that Lobov would face UFC newcomer Chris Avila at UFC 202. Lobov won the fight via unanimous decision.

Lobov faced Teruto Ishihara on November 19, 2016, at UFC Fight Night 99. He won the fight via unanimous decision (30–27, 30–27, and 29–28).

Lobov faced Cub Swanson on April 22, 2017, in the main event at UFC Fight Night 108. He lost the fight via unanimous decision. Both participants were awarded Fight of the Night for their performances.

Lobov faced Andre Fili on October 21, 2017, at UFC Fight Night 118. He lost the fight via unanimous decision.

Lobov was initially scheduled to face Alex Caceres on April 7, 2018, at UFC 223, but was removed from the card for his role in the Team SBG bus assault.

Lobov was scheduled to face Zubaira Tukhugov on October 27, 2018, at UFC Fight Night 138. However, it was reported that Tukhugov was removed from the fight due his role in the UFC 229 post-fight melee, and he was replaced by Michael Johnson. At weight-ins, Johnson weighed in at 147 pounds, one pound over the featherweight limit of 146 pounds. As a result, the fight proceeded at a catchweight bout and Johnson forfeited 20% of his purse to Lobov, which Lobov later returned. He lost the fight via unanimous decision.

On January 29, 2019, it was reported that Lobov was released from UFC.

Post-UFC career
On September 12, 2020, it was announced that Lobov had signed a one-fight contract with Arena Fight Championship. He was expected to make his promotional debut against Ylies Djiroun on December 12, 2020, but the whole event was postponed due to multiple COVID-19 cases.

Bare knuckle boxing
Shortly after his UFC release, it was announced that Lobov signed a three-fight contract with Bare Knuckle Fighting Championship (BKFC), with a clause to be able to compete in MMA also. He faced Jason Knight in the main event of Bare Knuckle FC 5 on April 6, 2019. He won the fight via unanimous decision.

Lobov's next fight was against Paulie Malignaggi, with whom he had a physical altercation during the BKFC media day before his bout with Knight. Malignaggi has history with Lobov's training partner, Conor McGregor, and the bout between Lobov and Malignaggi was billed to be a "grudge match" and took place at BKFC 6 on June 22, 2019. Lobov won the fight via unanimous decision. After a consensus strong opening two rounds for Malignaggi, Lobov utilized forward pressure and volume to win in rounds three through five, earning a 48–47 on all three judges' scorecards.

Lobov faced Jason Knight in a rematch headlining Bare Knuckle FC 9 on November 16, 2019. Knight won by TKO via corner stoppage in the fifth and final round.

Lobov faced Ukrainian 2012 Olympic silver medalist and professional boxer Denys Berinchyk in a bare-knuckle match at Mahatch FC in Kyiv, Ukraine on July 24, 2021. Lobov was knocked down in the third and fourth rounds and ultimately lost by TKO after failing to come out for the fifth round.

Championships & accomplishments

Mixed martial arts
 Ultimate Fighting Championship
 Fight of the Night (One time) vs. Cub Swanson

Mixed martial arts record

|-
|Loss
|align=center|13-15–1 (1)
|Michael Johnson
|Decision (unanimous)
|UFC Fight Night: Volkan vs. Smith
|
|align=center|3
|align=center|5:00
|Moncton, New Brunswick, Canada
|
|-
|Loss
|align=center|13–14–1 (1)
|Andre Fili
|Decision (unanimous) 
|UFC Fight Night: Cowboy vs. Till
|
|align=center|3
|align=center|5:00
|Gdańsk, Poland
|
|-
|Loss
|align=center|13–13–1 (1)
|Cub Swanson
|Decision (unanimous) 
|UFC Fight Night: Swanson vs. Lobov
|
|align=center|5
|align=center|5:00
|Nashville, Tennessee, United States
|
|-
|Win
|align=center|13–12–1 (1)
|Teruto Ishihara
|Decision (unanimous) 
|UFC Fight Night: Mousasi vs. Hall 2
|
|align=center|3
|align=center|5:00
|Belfast, Northern Ireland
|
|-
|Win
|align=center|12–12–1 (1)
|Chris Avila
|Decision (unanimous)
|UFC 202
|
|align=center|3
|align=center|5:00
|Las Vegas, Nevada, United States
|
|-
|Loss
|align=center|11–12–1 (1)
|Alex White
|Decision (unanimous)
|UFC Fight Night: Hendricks vs. Thompson
|
|align=center|3
|align=center|5:00
|Las Vegas, Nevada, United States
|
|-
|Loss
|align=center|11–11–1 (1)
|Ryan Hall
|Decision (unanimous)
|The Ultimate Fighter: Team McGregor vs. Team Faber Finale
|
|align=center|3
|align=center|5:00
|Las Vegas, Nevada, United States
|
|-
| Win
| align=center|11–10–1 (1)
| Rasul Shovhalov
| Submission (armbar)
| ACB 13: Poland vs. Russia
| 
| align=center|2
| align=center|1:32
| Płock, Poland
| 
|-
| Draw
| align=center| (1)
| Pawel Kielek
| Draw (majority)
| Fighters Arena 10
| 
| align=center|3
| align=center|5:00
| Łódź, Poland
| 
|-
| Win
| align=center|10–10 (1)
| Andrew Fisher
| TKO (punches)
| Cage Warriors 70
| 
| align=center|3
| align=center|4:59
| Dublin, Ireland
|  
|-
| Loss
| align=center|9–10 (1)
| Michael Doyle
| Decision (unanimous)
| Clan Wars 19
| 
| align=center|3
| align=center|5:00
| Belfast, Northern Ireland
| 
|-
| Loss
| align=center|9–9 (1)
| Andre Winner
| Decision (unanimous)
| All or Nothing 6
| 
| align=center|3
| align=center|5:00
| Leeds, England
| 
|-
| Win
| align=center|9–8 (1)
| Ali Maclean
| Decision (split)
| All or Nothing 6
| 
| align=center|3
| align=center|5:00
| Leeds, England
| 
|-
| Loss
| align=center|8–8 (1)
| Alex Enlund
| Technical Submission (rear-naked choke)
| Cage Warriors 65
| 
| align=center|1
| align=center|2:24
| Dublin, Ireland
|
|-
| Win
| align=center|8–7 (1)
| Martin Svensson
| TKO (punches)
| Trophy MMA 3: New Year's Bash 2
| 
| align=center|2
| align=center|3:51
| Malmö, Sweden
|
|-
| Loss
| align=center|7–7 (1)
| Christian Holley
| Decision (unanimous)
| OMMAC 19: Vendetta
| 
| align=center|3
| align=center|5:00
| Liverpool, England
|
|-
| Win
| align=center|7–6 (1)
| Kamil Gniadek
| Decision (unanimous)
| Immortals Fight Promotions 1
| 
| align=center|3
| align=center|5:00
| Aberdeen, Scotland
| 
|-
| Win
| align=center|6–6 (1)
| Andy Green
| TKO (elbows)
| Immortal Fighting Championship 8
| 
| align=center|1
| align=center|N/A
| Letterkenny, Ireland
|
|-
| Win
| align=center|5–6 (1)
| Alex Leite
| Decision (split)
| Cage Contender 17: Rooney vs. Philpott
| 
| align=center|3
| align=center|5:00
| Newry, Northern Ireland
|
|-
| NC
| align=center|4–6 (1)
| Artur Sowinski
| NC (overturned)
| Celtic Gladiator 5
| 
| align=center|3
| align=center|5:00
| Dublin, Ireland
|
|-
| Loss
| align=center|4–6
| Jay Furness
| Decision (unanimous)
| Cage Warriors Fight Night 7
| 
| align=center|3
| align=center|5:00
| Amman, Jordan
| 
|-
| Win
| align=center|4–5
| Shay Walsh
| TKO (punches)
| OMMAC 14: Bring the Pain
| 
| align=center|3
| align=center|0:22
| Liverpool, England
| 
|-
| Loss
| align=center|3–5
| Araik Margarian
| Decision (unanimous)
| Pancrase Fighting Championship 4
| 
| align=center|3
| align=center|5:00
| Marseilles, France
| 
|-
| Win
| align=center|3–4
| Kamil Korycki
| Decision (unanimous) 
| Cage Warriors: 46
| 
| align=center|3
| align=center|5:00
| Kyiv, Ukraine
| 
|-
| Loss
| align=center|2–4
| Saul Rogers
| Decision (split)
| Budo 3: Rogers vs. Lobov
| 
| align=center|3
| align=center|5:00
| Bolton, England
| 
|-
| Loss
| align=center|2–3
| Mike Wilkinson
| TKO (punches)
| Raw 1: Enter Colosseum
| 
| align=center|2
| align=center|3:52
| Liverpool, England
| 
|-
| Loss
| align=center|2–2
| Steve O'Keefe
| Technical Submission (rear-naked choke)
| Cage Warriors 43
| 
| align=center|3
| align=center|1:24
| London, England
|
|-
| Win
| align=center|2–1
| Uche Ihiekwe
| Submission (triangle choke)
| OMMAC 10: Step in the Arena
| 
| align=center|3
| align=center|1:07
| Liverpool, England
| 
|-
| Win
| align=center|1–1
| Dave Hill
| Decision (unanimous)
| Cage Warriors 41
| 
| align=center|3
| align=center|5:00
| London, England
|
|-
| Loss
| align=center|0–1
| Patrick Vickers
| Decision (unanimous)
| Cage Warriors 39: The Uprising
| 
| align=center|3
| align=center|5:00
| Cork, Ireland
|

|-
|Win
|align=center|3–1
|Julian Erosa
|TKO (punches)
|rowspan=4|The Ultimate Fighter: Team McGregor vs Team Faber
|
|align=center|1
|align=center|1:00
|rowspan=4|Las Vegas, Nevada, United States
|
|-
|Win
|align=center|2–1
|Chris Gruetzemacher
|KO (punches)
|
|align=center|2
|align=center|3:15
|
|-
|Win
|align=center|1–1
|James Jenkins
|TKO (punches)
|
|align=center|1
|align=center|4:07
|
|-
|Loss
|align=center|0–1
|Mehdi Baghdad
|Decision (majority) 
|
|align=center|2
|align=center|5:00
|
|-

Bare knuckle record

|Loss
|align=center|2–2
|style="text-align:left;"|Denys Berinchyk
|TKO (retirement)
|Mahatch FC 6
|
|align=center|4
|align=center|2:00
|Kyiv, Ukraine
|
|-
|Loss
|align=center|2–1
|style="text-align:left;"|Jason Knight
|TKO (corner stoppage)
|Bare Knuckle FC 9
|
|align=center|5
|align=center|0:27
|Biloxi, Mississippi, United States
|
|-
|Win
|align=center|2–0
|style="text-align:left;"|Paulie Malignaggi
|Decision (unanimous)
|Bare Knuckle FC 6
|
|align=center|5
|align=center|2:00
|Tampa, Florida, United States 
|
|-
|Win
|align=center|1–0
|style="text-align:left;"|Jason Knight
|Decision (unanimous)
|Bare Knuckle FC 5
|
|align=center|5
|align=center|2:00
|Biloxi, Mississippi, United States
|
|-

See also
 List of current UFC fighters
 List of male mixed martial artists

References

External links
 
 

1986 births
Russian practitioners of Brazilian jiu-jitsu
Living people
Russian male mixed martial artists
Lightweight mixed martial artists
Featherweight mixed martial artists
Sportspeople from Nizhny Novgorod
Welterweight mixed martial artists
Mixed martial artists utilizing Brazilian jiu-jitsu
Ultimate Fighting Championship male fighters
Bare-knuckle boxers